Vlachovo Březí is a town in Prachatice District in the South Bohemian Region of the Czech Republic. It has about 1,700 inhabitants. The town centre is well preserved and is protected by law as an urban monument zone.

Administrative parts

Villages of Chocholatá Lhota, Dachov, Dolní Kožlí, Doubrava, Horní Kožlí, Mojkov and Uhřice are administrative parts of Vlachovo Březí.

Geography
It lies in the Bohemian Forest Foothills.

History
The first written mention of Vlachovo Březí is from 1274, then called just Březí. Around 1415, Březí was renamed Vlachovo Březí after its owner, knight Vladislav Vlach Malovec. In 1538, the settlement is promoted to a market town by Ferdinand I and received its coat of arms. In 1868, it gained the town status from Franz Joseph I.

Sights

Vlachovo Březí Castle was a fortress, rebuilt into a Renaissance castle in 1561. In 1698, it was rebuilt into its current early Baroque form. Today it is unused and the premises are offered for rent.

The first mention of a brewery in Vlachovo Březí is from 1623. The Manor Brewery in its current form was founded around 1670 and its capacity caused the gradual demise of breweries in the surrounding villages. The Baroque brewery building with distinctive gables was built in the 18th century and forms the western wing of the castle complex. The beer brewing continued until 1924. In 2014–2015, the valuable building was repaired and now it is owned by the town. The beer brewing was renewed in 2017.

The original Church of the Annunciation was first mentioned in 1359, when it was built in the Romanesque style. In  1659–1669, the church was rebuilt in the Baroque style, in which form it still stands today.

Notable people
Joseph Drechsler (1782–1852), Austrian organist and composer
Jakub Bursa (1813–1884), architect; died here
Karel Traxler (1866–1936), chess master
Jan Matulka (1890–1972), Czech-American modern artist

Twin towns – sister cities

Vlachovo Březí is twinned with:
 Sankt Oswald-Riedlhütte, Germany

References

External links

Cities and towns in the Czech Republic
Populated places in Prachatice District
Prácheňsko